Mieczysław Szumiec (24 March 1907 – 19 January 1993) was a Polish footballer. He played in one match for the Poland national football team in 1926.

References

External links
 

1907 births
1993 deaths
Polish footballers
Poland international footballers
Place of birth missing
Association footballers not categorized by position